Michel Roquejeoffre (born 28 November 1933) is a retired French Army General (rapid forces), who commanded Operation Daguet (French operations during the 1991 Gulf War). French forces, a part of the coalition forces, counted 18,000 soldiers and took a direct involvement in the battles with Iraqi forces, both on Kuwait and Iraqi territories.

Before that Roquejeoffre participated in the Algerian War and later missions in Chad, Lebanon and Cambodia. He entered Saint-Cyr in 1952. He retired in 1991.

Allied commander, U.S. General Norman Schwarzkopf Jr. described Roquejeoffre in his memoirs as one of his most trusted confidants during the war. Roquejeoffre was awarded the Legion of Merit by the United States for his services in the Gulf War.

References
 Norman Schwarzkopf, Jr., It Doesn't Take a Hero, 1992

1933 births
Living people
Military personnel from Paris
French generals
French military personnel of the Algerian War
French military personnel of the Gulf War
Military leaders of the Gulf War
Recipients of the Legion of Merit